is a Japanese writer. He writes light novels and manga.

Works
Scrapped Princess (light novel, 1999 – 2005; manga, 2002–2004)
Strait Jacket (light novel, 2000 – 2010)
Magician's Academy (light novel, 2003 – 2007; manga, 2006, 2008 – 2009)
Shinkyoku Sōkai Polyphonica (light novel, Crimson (2006–2013), Crimson S (2008–2010), After School (2012–2013); Eiphonic Songbird (2012–2014); manga, 2007 – 2012) 
Code-E (manga, 2007 – 2008; light novel, 2008)
Chaika - The Coffin Princess (light novel, 2010 – 2015; anime, 2014)
Outbreak Company (light novel, 2011 – 2017; manga, 2012–2014 ; anime 2013)
Karakuri Onigami Akatsuki (light novel, 2013 – 2014)
Blue Steel Blasphemer (light novel, 2015 – 2016)
Paramilitary Company (light novel, 2017)

External links

 
Manga artists
Light novelists
Living people
1969 births
Writers from Osaka Prefecture
Osaka University alumni